Manitou Park may refer to:
George H. Crosby Manitou State Park, Minnesota, in Lake county
Manitou Islands Provincial Park, Ontario, a provincial park near North Bay
Manitou Park, British Columbia, in the Naramata community 
Manitou Park, Ontario, a neighbourhood in Sault Ste. Marie
Manitou Park School House, New Jersey, an NRHP property
Manitou Park Recreation Area, Colorado, a Pikes National Forest recreation area in Teller County

See also
Mount Manitou Park, Manitou Springs, Colorado, a former summit park accessed using the Manitou Incline funicular railway